Embu is a city located approximately  northeast of Nairobi towards Mount Kenya. Embu served as the provincial capital of the former Eastern Province and currently serves as the headquarters of the Eastern Region in Kenya. It is also the county headquarters of Embu County. Located on the south-eastern foothills of Mount Kenya, the Municipality of Embu had a population of 204,979 in 2019 census. Embu is also the 8th Largest Municipality in Kenya.Embu municipality has been ranked as the fastest growing municipality Outside municipalities within Nairobi.It is the commercial hub of the Central Eastern part of Kenya and provides an avenue for trade, tourism and highway transit between the national capital and the Northern Frontier.

History 
Embu town is a major trading centre in Eastern Kenya. For a long time, it was the main economic centre for the Embu, Mbeere, Meru  and Kamba communities as well as other communities from central Kenya.

Origins of Embu people are cited from North West Africa. They moved south to Congo. Then they later moved Eastward to the coast of Kenya via Tanganyika. It is in Tanganyika that there were intermarriages with both natives and migrants from farther south (mostly Bantus).
Due to many circumstances they moved North towards Meru leaving their relatives, the Gikuyu at Ithanga. They then crossed Igambang'ombe ford. They settled at Gikuuri near Maranga hills. They had come from Igembe and came to Tharaka where they also settled. They left Tharaka possibly due to famines and moved to the current Embu.

It is believed as they moved towards the slopes of Mt Kenya, they encountered pygmy tribes such as the Gumba and the Zimba in the forest; some of whom were cannibalistic. They are cultivators. They planted crops like sorghum, millet and sweet potatoes. Today they have cash crops like coffee, tea, miraa and macadamia, among others.

Geography 
It was the provincial headquarters of the defunct Eastern province, and is currently the Embu County Headquarters, hosting major public offices and institutions, including Embu Provincial General Hospital.

The area around the Municipality of Embu has conducive altitude for endurance training by athletes. As such, Kenyan athletes use the altitude and climate advantage of Embu for training, with specialised facilities at Kigari Teachers' Training College, about  outside Embu Town.

The Municipality of Embu, Kenya is known for its jacaranda trees that literally turn the municipality into a purple shower when in bloom.  The Jacaranda trees usually bloom in October–November each year, depending on the rainfall.

Way past Kigari Teachers College approximately 25 km from Embu Town is a small town known as Kianjokoma that is a centre for other shopping centres like Miandari, Kathande, Kiriari, Irangi and others; This town is fast growing due to the situated Tea factory - Mungania Tea Factory and now a County Hospital as well as a police line in the area. Other small towns in Embu are Kibugu, Karurumo, Rukuriri, Mukuuri, Kathageri, Kanja and Manyatta.

Climate

Religion 
There are numerous Christian churches and ministries in Embu, including the Seventh Day Adventist, East African Pentecostal Churches Dallas, Gakwegori, Kigumo, Kanginga, Kathari, Karurumo, Kiritiri among others Anglican Church of Kenya's St. Paul's Cathedral, the Presbyterian Church of East Africa's Blue Valley, PCEA, the national independent church of Africa, the African independent Pentecostal church of Africa, Majimbo, Kangaru Kathangariri, Kibugu, Kavutiri, Ndunduri, Itabua, Gichera, Makengi, Kirigiri and the Roman Catholic Diocese of Embu's Sts. Peter and Paul Cathedral. The latter cathedral has a unique African-inspired design and is among the largest in Africa. Missions for Christ Ministries office and churches in Embu county. Churches under Missions for Christ Ministries includes Kevote Family Church, Embu town Family Church, Runyenjes Family Church, Kamugere Family Church and Kianjokoma Family Church. The national Independent church of Africa is located at Gakwegwori (Mwamba Imara), Kianjokoma, Kiriari, Kithunguriri, Kamugere, Mukuuri, Keria, Kibugu, and Kavutiri.

Another Protestant church, the first encountered, on entering Embu from Kirinyaga county is that of the Kenya Assemblies of God (KAG). It is better known as the Eastern Gate assembly as it is also the first church encountered on crossing into Eastern Province from all the Provinces except North Eastern.

Family Worship Church Inc is a Protestant Christian church founded in the early 1970s. It has the headquarters at Nembure and branches in Manyatta, Kithimu, Kiandundu, Gaikiro, Makengi and is in the process of starting a branch in Embu town.

Electoral subdivisions 
Embu forms a municipality that has seven wards (Blue Valley, Itabua, Kamiu, Kangaru, Majengo, Matakari and Njukiri). All of them belong to Manyatta Constituency, which has a total of eleven wards. The remaining four are located within Embu County Council, the rural council of Embu.

Notable residents
 Jeremiah J. M. Nyagah - former cabinet minister.
 Joseph Nyagah - son of Jeremiah Nyagah and former cabinet minister.
 Justin Muturi  - Speaker of the National Assembly 
 Kithinji Kiragu - public sector management consultant; retired
 Patrick Njiru - safari rally driver in east Africa
 Cardinal John Njue - Archbishop of Nairobi and former Bishop of Embu
 Martin Nyaga Wambora - first Governor of Embu; former Runyenjes MP and chair of Kenya Airports Authority

University education 
 University of Embu
 Embu College
 Jeremiah Nyagah 
 Kenyatta University Embu

See also 
 Embu people
 Embu County
Rotary club of Embu
Rotaract club of Embu

References

External links
 Embu University College
 Embu Water and Sanitation Company
 Embu Music
 Aerial imagery and geographical features around Embu, Kenya

 
Populated places in Eastern Province (Kenya)
County capitals in Kenya